Tebe-Tebe is a community council located in the Berea District of Lesotho. Its population in 2006 was 16,533.

Villages
The community of Tebe-Tebe includes the villages of Ha 'Matanki, Ha 'Neko, Ha Boimamelo, Ha Jane, Ha Johane, Ha Lefoleri, Ha Lejone, Ha Lenkoane, Ha Leponesa, Ha Lereko, Ha Lethokonyane, Ha Leutsoa, Ha Macheche, Ha Majoro, Ha Makhatseane, Ha Makhula, Ha Malefetsane (Ha Ntlama), Ha Mapeshoane (Malimong), Ha Matjotjo, Ha Matsipe, Ha Mika, Ha Mohatlane, Ha Moholobela, Ha Mokhameleli, Ha Mokhethi, Ha Mokolanyane, Ha Molahli, Ha Mona, Ha Monethi, Ha Moorosane, Ha Morake, Ha Naleli, Ha Nkhahle, Ha Ntlama, Ha Ntsekhe, Ha Pii, Ha Pitso, Ha Ramaema, Ha Ramapaeane, Ha Ramaqele, Ha Ramosenyehi, Ha Selei, Ha Sello, Ha Tello, Ha Tsai, Ha Tsikoane, Ha Tsikoane Phalole, Ha Tsimatsi, Liolong, Lipohong, Litooaneng, and Masuoeng.

References

External links
 Google map of community villages

Populated places in Berea District